Top Cat Begins (also known in Spanish as Don Gato: El Inicio de la Pandilla, Top Cat: The Start of the Gang) is a 2015 computer-animated comedy film, produced by Ánima Estudios and distributed by Warner Bros. Pictures in Mexico. Based on the Hanna-Barbera animated television series Top Cat, this film is a prequel to both the series and the previous film, taking place before Top Cat met his gang.

The film was first released in Mexico on 30 October 2015, where it was moderately successful, while an underperformance of its more-successful predecessor, and has grossed $54.1 million pesos.

Internationally, the film was later released in the United Kingdom on 27 May 2016, distributed by Kaleidoscope Film Distribution and Warner Bros. UK, where it was met with negative reviews and was a major box office bomb.

The film has grossed a worldwide total $4.6 million on an $8 million budget.

The film was released in limited form on 29 September 2017 in the United States and later on 10 October in home video and digital platforms, distributed by Viva Pictures.

Plot
Top Cat comes to New York City when he hears a horrible sound he told the cat to stop playing it the cat agrees and says he needs to make more money to buy dough but Top Cat says that he would help him if he gets most of the money the cat aggress and says his name is Benny the Ball and the two make money with Benny playing the violin with horrible skills. When it was the end of the day TC suggests they should go to Mrs. B's place on the way they bump into two orphans who stole cakes from the bakery just then an officer called Officer Charlie Dibble comes and tries to arrest them but TC defends them and tells him they had been with him all day. Dibble trusts him and leaves the orphans then the orphans tell Top Cat about Bad Dog and if they don't get enough money he would burn the orphanage down. Top Cat says he would talk to him but Bad Dog beats him before he could say a word. TC and Benny go to Mrs. B's place where they are about to eat dinner but they get stew. While Benny is enjoying it TC doesn't like it and suggests if he and Benny would work together he should be cool and he shouldn't eat horrible food.

The next day TC and Benny pull cons on the New York residents which causes the New York City Police Department to be onto them and they choose Officer Dibble to spy on the two. Later that day TC and Benny go into an apartment and try to con more people when they ring the doorbell but the person turns out to be Officer Dibble and he chases them all over the city until he loses them TC and Benny then bump into Bad Dog and company and Bad Dog threatens them to stop playing cons and throw them in a garbage can soon they find out that they work for Mr. Big and TC plans to rob the place by switching the bags that Bad Dog has once they rob the place TC chooses Benny to keep it for him. Later in the night TC and Benny are at the Starlight Club when they get taken to the kitchen and get knocked out. The two suddenly find themselves in Mr. Big's office. Mr. Big then forces them to tell him where his diamonds are and TC suggests that he would show him. Mr. Big agrees and tells Bad Dog to go with them. When they got to Benny's house TC asks him where the diamonds where but Benny forgot so TC tricks Bad Dog to get eaten by a chair and the two escape from the house. The next day Mr. Big's goons make wanted posters for Top Cat and Benny so the two call Officer Dibble to help them but Dibble suggests Granny Dibble should look after them so Dibble escorts them to the train station.

Once they get to their destination they meet Granny Dibble who isn't what the two think she is. She then forces them to do chores and eat crackers. While painting the fence Top Cat gets knocked out by three cats from the circus that got fired because they let out the lion and Top Cat agrees to help the three cats whose names are Choo-Choo, Fancy-Fancy and Brain but instead of helping them he tricks them into doing his chores. Later that day they go to get ice cream but on the way, a gangster spots TC and Benny and reports them to Bad Dog. Once they get back they find Bad Dog and company and they try to kill them but luckily Granny Dibble saves them. Top Cat and Benny return to New York in the evening and TC gets mad at Benny because he spent money on a chocolate bar. Benny then feels sad and walks away.

Later that night Benny gets home and his mom tells him she sold the diamonds to a club owned by Mr. Big called The Starlight Club so Benny goes on a mission to steal the diamonds back. Later that night TC goes into Officer Dibble's house and tells him about Benny left him and Dibble suggests that they should find him. Meanwhile, Benny sneaks into the club and discuses himself as a singer but then he gets caught and is chased around the club suddenly TC and Dibble arrive but get chased down by an angry mob and Benny gets captured by Mr. Big's goons. To save Top Cat, Dibble sends him to Florida. While at the airport, he realizes that all he needs is friends and returns to New York then Choo-Choo, Brain and Fancy-Fancy and they agree to help Top Cat.

Then Top Cat agrees for the guy to help and he reveals his name is Spook, a pizza cat who lost his true love Eleanor the Motorcycle because of Mr. Big and the five make a plan to rescue Benny the Ball. Suddenly Mr. Big's goons shoot a pizza box and all there is a recording of Top Cat's voice and Top Cat disguises himself as a businessman and makes the residents chase down Mr. Big. To get away Mr. Big climbs up a chain. To stop him, Top Cat and Benny cut the chain. The next day Top Cat apologizes to Benny and tells his gang to meet him at Hoagy's Alley. Meanwhile, the residents and Dibble turn Mr. Big in. Later that day Top Cat buries Mr. Big's diamonds under the alley but it ends up giving it to the two orphans and Top Cat's gang end the film by singing the original theme song.

Voice cast

 Jason Harris Katz as Top Cat/Choo-Choo/Brain 
 Chris Edgerly as Benny the Ball
 Diedrich Bader as Bad Dog
 Darin De Paul as Mr. Big
 Bill Lobley as Officer Charlie Dibble
 Dave Boat as Chief Thumbton
 Charlie Adler as Granny Dibble
 Matthew Piazzi as Fancy-Fancy
 Lauri Fraser as Mrs. B
 Benjamin Diskin as Spook
 Marieve Herington as Panther
 Joey D'Auria as Rat
 Patty Mattson as Furletta Duchat

Additional voices include David Shaughnessy, Nick Shakoour, Steve Blum, Grey DeLisle, Diane Michelle, Rachael MacFarlane, Pamela Chollet, Jim Ward, G. K. Bowes, Sean Kenin, and Sue Boyajian.

Production
After the success of the first Top Cat film from 2011, the filmmakers at Ánima Estudios began development of another film based on the Hanna-Barbera property, but with the idea of an origin story. The original Top Cat cartoon, which ran on ABC from 1961 to 1962, has already gained massive popularity in Latin America during the time of its run, mainly due to the show's well-performed dubbing and translation. The film was in development for 10 months. While expressing their 'confidence', getting the rights of a Hanna-Barbera property was difficult for the producers. The company's rights to develop a film based on Top Cat has been previously accomplished for the 2011 film, so Warner Bros., the current owner of all HB properties, have maintained the same 'confidence' of working with the Mexican animation studio. Producer Jose C. Garcia de Letona called the film "a work of persuasion and persistence" since he also stated that the company "knows and understands the character".

Director Andrés Couturier, who has also directed another film adaptation of a classic animation property, Kung-Fu Magoo based on Mr. Magoo, has been attached to direct the animated prequel film since he has grew up watching the original Hanna-Barbera cartoon, stating that the character has "influenced" him. "Some people say that the Don Gato (Top Cat) [character] in this movie looks a lot like me, [and] I think I [do] look a lot like him because my whole childhood was very influenced by the character, so I worked with a character who was with you during all your childhood [which] is incredible," said Couturier.

Animation
Unlike the previous film, which was animated in 2D Adobe Flash, the film was animated entirely in computer-generated imagery, according to producer Jose Garcia de Letona. Animation production is handled by Discreet Arts Productions in India, which previously collaborated with Ánima's past CG project, Guardians of Oz.

The animation process was an 'important' step for the entire company. Producer Garcia de Letona has admitted that, despite the studio's interest for 2D animated productions, they wanted to reach a wider market focused on CG distribution. "[It's] a style that catches the attention of distributors," he said.

Rafael González, the film's art director, stated that the film's animation was a "challenge" due to the production's full transition to CG. "It was a challenge[.] [I]t seemed important to preserve the graphic and aesthetic essence of the original series [-] that the character was still Don Gato (Top Cat) despite having been translated into this new volumetric universe," said González. González, who also worked for the preceding film, was not familiar of the original cartoon at the time, but recognizing the popularity between in Latin America and the United States. "I did not watch the series at the time[.] I knew it was broadcast, but I think it was very small," he said. González also added that he, "had a great opportunity in the first film, [where] I had to do conceptual art, which is a great pride. I did not live in that era of Don Gato (Top Cat), so it was my turn when interest opened with the new film and now, with 'Don Gato, El Incio de la Pandilla' (Top Cat: The Start of the Gang), we are trying to present a new version for the new generations."

Writing
The film's screenplay is written by James Krieg (known for writing the Scooby-Doo television shows), Doug Langdale, and Jorge Ramírez-Suárez. To help the plot match the premise of the original cartoon, Warner Bros. Animation has accompanied with the film's writing process, to which producer Garcia de Letona calls it "welcom[ing] and grateful[...]"

Casting
For the English version, Jason Harris Katz, the voice of Top Cat and other characters from the first film, has announced via his Twitter that he will reprise his role as the same character. It was also announced that voice actors Chris Edgerly, Bill Lobley, Hope Levy, and David Hoffman, have also joined the English cast.

Soundtrack
The film was composed by Leoncio Lara, who said "we wanted to show the spirit of the original show and that meant the music we wanted to keep that jazz Broadway feel to the movie but update it so it can fit the cinematic approach". The film also had popular pop and recognisable songs to get the kids to see the movie.

Release
The film's Mexican release trailer premiered on 1 July 2015, followed by second trailer, released on 14 September 2015.

The film was released on 30 October 2015 in Mexico, distributed by Warner Bros. Pictures Mexico and confirmed to release in the rest of Latin America.

The film is followed by a United Kingdom release on 27 May 2016, distributed by Kaleidoscope Film Distribution and Warner Bros. Pictures UK. "We are very excited to be working with Ánima Estudios, [by] bringing this latest chapter of Top Cat to a worldwide audience," said Spencer Pollard, CEO of KFD. "As a leading global animation brand, we’re looking forward to T.C. and his friends hitting [the] screens everywhere in 2016." The film's UK release and English-language trailer was released on 8 March 2016.

Box office
On its opening weekend in Mexico, the film debuted at No. 3 with a gross of $18.1 million pesos ($1.09 million USD), performing weaker than its predecessor.

On its opening weekend in the United Kingdom, the film was a major box-office bomb, debuting at No. 15, with X-Men: Apocalypse and Alice Through the Looking Glass leading, and only earning £0.06 million ($0.1 million USD).

Home media
It was released on DVD in the United States on 10 October 2017 from Viva Pictures.

Reception
The film has received negative reviews, with criticism focused on the animation, directing, pacing, writing and humor, but critics praised the film's dubbing and effort to revive the original show's characters. On Rotten Tomatoes, the film has a rating of 14%, based on 7 reviews, with an average rating of 2.90/10.

Carlos Del Río of Cine Premiere gave this film a 1 star rating, saying that the film has "[c]heated again. [The] Top Cat film fails to approach the spirit and humor of the TV series." Eddie Harrison, writing in The List, gave the film 3/5 stars, saying, "The feline favourite returns for a likeably familiar, knockabout animation. As with J. J. Abrams' first Star Trek movie, there's a reasonable amount of fun in seeing how the iconic characters originally met each other...director Andrés Couturier's film wisely scales things down as it attempts to get back to the comedic values of its source material." British critic Mark Kermode was scathing, describing the film as "tooth-gratingly terrible".

See also
 Top Cat
 Top Cat: The Movie
 Ánima Estudios
 List of films based on Hanna-Barbera cartoons

References

External links
Official website (in Spanish)

Top Cat films
2015 films
2015 3D films
2015 computer-animated films
2010s American animated films
2010s children's comedy films
2010s children's fantasy films
Films based on television series
Mexican fantasy films
Mexican animated films
Indian animated films
2010s Spanish-language films
Warner Bros. animated films
Ánima Estudios films
Hanna-Barbera animated films
2010s children's animated films
Films set on trains
3D animated films
Films set in New York City
Animated films based on animated series
2015 comedy films
2010s English-language films
2010s Mexican films
Animated films about cats